Charles Richard Beam (February 15, 1925—January 26, 2018) was a major figure in twentieth-century Pennsylvania German linguistics, folklore studies, and social history who wrote  under the pen-name Es Bischli-Gnippli (Little Clodhopper). He was born in Lancaster County, Pennsylvania, and received his doctorate in German at the University of Pennsylvania (Ph.D. 1970).

Beam wrote newspaper columns in the Pennsylvania German dialect for over fifty years, and also hosted radio broadcasts in Pennsylvania German from 1971 until 2013.

A member of the Evangelical Lutheran Church in America, Beam also belonged to the Pennsylvania German Society and a large number of German-American and Pennsylvania local history organizations.

Works 
An Abridged Pennsylvania German Dictionary (1970)
(with Jennifer Trout) The Comprehensive Pennsylvania German Dictionary (2004-2012)
William Keel and C. Richard Beam, editors, The Language and Culture of the Pennsylvania Germans: a Festschrift for Earl C. Haag (2010)

Further reading 

Simon J. Bronner, Joshua R. Brown, Pennsylvania Germans: An Interpretive Encyclopedia (2017) 
Earl C. Haag, A Pennsylvania German Anthology (1988)

See also 
Preston Barba
Pennsylvania German Society

References 

1925 births
2018 deaths
American lexicographers
American writers in Pennsylvania Dutch
Pennsylvania Dutch culture
German language in the United States
University of Pennsylvania School of Arts and Sciences alumni
Linguists from the United States